Hisøya or Hisøy (historically: Hisøen) is an island in Agder county, Norway. The island has been part of the municipality of Arendal since 1992. The main village areas on the island are Kolbjørnsvik, His, Slåbervig, and Sandviga. The village of Kolbjørnsvik is located across the harbor from the town of Arendal. There are two bridges that connect Hisøya to the mainland: the Strøm Bridge on the northwest side of the island and the Vippa Bridge on the southwest side of the island.

The  island lies along the Skaggerak coast of southeastern Norway. Hisøya is separated from the mainland to the northwest by the river Nidelv. The island of Tromøya lies to the northeast, separated from Hisøya by the Galtesundet strait. The small islands of Ærøya, Havsøya, and Merdø lie just to the southeast of Hisøya.

Name
The island (originally the parish) is named Hisøy (or Hisøen) after the old His farm (Old Norse: Hís) since this is where the Hisøy Church is located. The first element, His, means "the cut" (probably referring to how the river Nidelva turns near the island) and the last element is øy or øen which means "island".

History
The island was historically part of the large prestegjeld of Øyestad. The boat "Kolbjørn" provided transportation across the harbor for over 100 years. In 1881, Hisøya and several surrounding islands were separated to form the new municipality of Hisøy.  This municipality existed from 1881 until 1992 when it was merged into the municipality of Arendal.

References

External links

Arendal
Islands of Agder